"Days of America" is a song recorded by American country music group Blackhawk.  It was released in November 2001 as the first single from the album Spirit Dancer.  The song reached #37 on the Billboard Hot Country Singles & Tracks chart.  The song was written by group members Dave Robbins and Henry Paul, along with Lee Thomas Miller.

Chart performance

References

2001 singles
2001 songs
Blackhawk (band) songs
Songs written by Lee Thomas Miller
Songs written by Dave Robbins (keyboardist)
Songs written by Henry Paul (musician)
Columbia Records singles